Andrew Cadle (11 September 1864 – 18 December 1938) was a South African cricketer. He played in two first-class matches for Eastern Province in 1890/91.

See also
 List of Eastern Province representative cricketers

References

External links
 

1864 births
1938 deaths
South African cricketers
Eastern Province cricketers
People from Uitenhage
Cricketers from the Eastern Cape